Park Jung-hyun (born March 23, 1976), also known as Lena Park, is an American-born South Korean singer who debuted in 1998 with the album, Piece. She is also widely known in South Korea as her nickname "National fairy" due to her petite body and powerful singing voice.

Early life and education
Born in Los Angeles, California, Park began singing as a child in the choir of her father's church. She won several singing contests before recording an amateur gospel album in 1993 when she was 16 years old.

Park attended UCLA for one year before beginning her singing career in 1998. She later transferred to Columbia University School of General Studies, where she graduated magna cum laude with a B.A. in English and Comparative Literature in 2010, and was inducted into Phi Beta Kappa.

Career

1998–2002: Piece, A Second Helping, Naturally and Op.4
Park released her first Korean album, Piece, in 1998. The album sold more than 500,000 copies.  She did not speak Korean very well at the time, which made it hard for her to connect with fans.  In 1999, A Second Helping was released.  It also was well received by both fans and the critics. Park's third album, Naturally, was mixed in both South Korea and the United States.

After a yearlong break from singing because of her studies in the United States, she came back in 2002 with her album called Op.4.  More comfortable with the media, she became much more accessible for talk shows and performances. In 2002, her song "" (In a Dream) was a big success and enabled her to enter foreign markets, such as  Singapore.  The South Korean government select Park to represent South Korea in the opening and closing ceremonies of the 2002 FIFA World Cup.  At the end of 2002, a "best of" album was released and she played a series of concerts.  Live recordings from these concerts were compiled into her first special live album in CDs and DVD.  Park, along with Brown Eyes (band), Chemistry (band), and Sowelu, formed the special unit conveniently called "Voices of Korea/Japan" and made the title song for the 2002 FIFA World Cup Official Album – Songs of Korea/Japan.  She later debuted in the Japanese music industry where she received moderate success.

2005–2009: On&On, Come To Where I Am and 10 Ways To Say I Love You
She is especially proud of her fifth Korean language album, On & On, because she felt that she was finally comfortable and confident singing and composing in Korean.  It took her about two years to make the album and, during that time, she became very involved with the production and creative work behind the album; she helped with many of the song arrangements, played the piano and guitar for some of the tracks, and composed four of the songs on the album.  In 2007, she performed the opening theme  of the Japanese anime television series Romeo x Juliet, which is a Japanese cover of Rolf Løvland and Brendan Graham's song You Raise Me Up.  The single also includes a cover of the English version.  Her sixth Korean album, Come To Where I Am, was released on December 11, 2007.  All songs were written and produced by herself. On February 27, 2009, she released her seventh album titled  10 Ways To Say I Love You with nine new tracks and "Secret" as lead track. On June 6, of the same year, she released a repackaged edition to include another title track, "Flood of tears".

2012: Parallax
After announcing the release of her eighth studio album, videos of her with composers she was working with for her album introducing her songs were released online.  Shortly after, on June 19, 2012, her album Parallax was released with the title track, "Sorry" (Korean: 미안해), being a remake of the Spanish language song Mientes by Mexican pop band Camila. After that, in July she featured for the Psy song What Would Have Been(ottessulkka), that sold over 2.000.000 digital copies in 2012. At the end of the year she released the Christmas song White Winter with Kim Bom-soo and the special album Gift, with a reboot of Parallax album songs and where she sings again the songs of I Am a Singer program.

2013–present: Mainstream success
In 2013 she released the cover of Atlantis Girl, originally sung by BoA, for hwangseongje project superhero 1st Line up, the O.S.T My Everything for the variety show We Got Married and the O.S.T. My Wish/Only In My Heart for The Heirs drama. On September 18, 2013 she won the special episode of I Am A Singer - Best 10 ( Best 10), beating Insooni for only three votes.

In 2014 she started the project Syncrofusion with Next Year and the M/V of Double Kiss, closing it in October with "Syncrofusion ) 2nd Lena Park + Brand New Music" and a cover of her song Sweet (feat. Verbal Jint) as lead track. She participated twice in the program Immortal Songs 2, for the first time for Lee Sun-hee special, singing Turning the Pages of Memories, the second time for Michael Bolton singing Completely. In December she collaborated with Dynamic Duo for "SsSs" digital single.

In September she became an English-speaking DJ for the newest KBS radio show, One Fine Day, on KBS World Radio New.
In December, Park officially signed a management contract with LOEN Entertainment (now kakao M)'s indie sub-label "Mun Hwa In". Again in December, she participated in Mnet program The Master for three episodes, singing a different version of her hit  ("In Dreams"),  (Miss Havisham's Waltz) and left the program covering 담배가게 아가씨. In December 21, Lena Park has been confirmed to join to Begin Again 2, the second season of a reality program where famous musicians from South Korea travel overseas to sing. During December 22–25 she has held her solo winter concert, named “Let It Snow” as the last year, at the SK Olympic Handball Stadium.

During the first months of 2018, she recorded for the reality show Begin Again 2 while on February 27 she sang for the 10th anniversary of the death of composer Lee Young-hoon. On April 7 she sang with others artists for POSCO's 50th Anniversary Celebration Concert at the Pohang Culture and Arts Center and on April 21 she sang  ("The Woman Outside The Window") for the first part of Cho Yong Pil special of Immortal Song. 
In May, the Lena Park team appear for the first time in Begin Again 2 in the last part of the seventh episode introducing her team, replacing the Kim Yoon-ah team. In the program she could sing some of her hits like  (In Dreams),  (Sweet) and You Mean Everything To Me, duetting very often with the member of her team, in particular with Lee Su-hyun of Akdong Musician. Her cover of Someone Like You by Adele got a lot of success on TV. Naver site web, surpassing 50.000 likes. In 20 November she return with The Wonder 2nd DS and sings again in the Christmas period with the concerts The Wonder: Let It Snow.

In February 2019 she sings Dream for the 30th anniversary of the amusement park Lotte World and after few days she released the song , and its music video, for the 100th anniversary of the first South Korean independence movement (March 1st Movement) with Yuna Kim and 정재일 (Jeong Jae-ill). In April her return for the third season of Begin Again is announced and she will be part of the same team with Henry, Su-Hyun, Harim and the new members Lim Heon and Kim Feel. In May she was selected by Disney Korea to promote Aladdin with John Park (존박) and on 13 May their Korean pop version of A Whole New World (arumdaun sesang) was released. After few days, on 13 May, she released the O.S.T.  (byeolbijjeorom; Like A Starlight) for the drama My Absolute Boyfriend (Jeoldae Geui). On 10 July her 9th full-length album was announced to be released on 18 July, seven years later to her last project Parallax (2012). On 18 July she released the 9th album The Wonder with a music video for the title track  (Gachi; With You) and besides the last digital single published in 2017 and 2018, the new tracks  (kieokahaja; "Remember") and "Seventeen", written and composed by Lena, are included.

In October 2022, she will hold a 4-day solo concert 'Now' at the LG Art Center Seoul from October 19 to 22.

Discography

Studio albums

Other albums

Singles

Other charted songs

Filmography

Television show

Web shows

Awards and nominations

References

External links

Official website 

1976 births
20th-century American singers
21st-century American singers
American emigrants to South Korea
American musicians of Korean descent
American people of South Korean descent
American Protestants
Avex Group artists
Columbia University School of General Studies alumni
Japanese-language singers
Kakao M artists
Living people
Musicians from Los Angeles
South Korean women pop singers
South Korean female idols
South Korean Protestants
Universal Music Japan artists
MAMA Award winners
Korean Music Award winners
People from Downey, California
Melon Music Award winners
20th-century American women singers
21st-century American women singers
21st-century South Korean singers